The expanded icosidodecahedron is a polyhedron, constructed as an expanded icosidodecahedron. It has 122 faces: 20 triangles, 60 squares, 12 pentagons, and 30 rhombs. The 120 vertices exist at two sets of 60, with a slightly different distance from its center.

It can also be constructed as a rectified rhombicosidodecahedron.

Other names 
 Expanded rhombic triacontahedron
 Rectified rhombicosidodecahedron
 Rectified small rhombicosidodecahedron
 Rhombirhombicosidodecahedron

Expansion 
The expansion operation from the rhombic triacontahedron can be seen in this animation:

Dissection 
This polyhedron can be dissected into a central rhombic triacontahedron surrounded by: 30 rhombic prisms, 20 tetrahedra, 12 pentagonal pyramids, 60 triangular prisms.

If the central rhombic triacontahedron and the 30 rhombic prisms are removed, you can create a toroidal polyhedron with all regular polygon faces.

Related polyhedra

See also 
 Rhombicosidodecahedron (expanded dodecahedron)
 Truncated rhombicosidodecahedron
 Expanded cuboctahedron

References

 Coxeter Regular Polytopes, Third edition, (1973), Dover edition,  (pp. 145–154 Chapter 8: Truncation)
 John H. Conway, Heidi Burgiel, Chaim Goodman-Strauss, The Symmetries of Things 2008,

External links 
 George Hart's Conway interpreter: generates polyhedra in VRML, taking Conway notation as input,  VRML model
 Convex Polyhedra containing Golden Rhombi: 2.  Expanded RTC ('XRTC') and related polyhedral
 Variations on a Rhombic Theme

Polyhedra